This is a list of professional wrestlers who currently wrestle for DDT Pro-Wrestling, Ganbare☆Pro-Wrestling and Tokyo Joshi Pro-Wrestling. Executive officers, referees and ring announcers are also listed.

Wrestlers
Personnel is organized below by their role in DDT Pro-Wrestling. Their ring name is on the left and their real name is on the right when known. Anybody inactive for a considerable amount of time is acknowledged. This list also acknowledges which unit a wrestler is a part of. "(L)" also indicates the leader of the group when one is designated.

DDT Pro-Wrestling

, there are eight central units in DDT:

Damnation T.A
Disaster Box
Eruption

DDTeeen!!
DDTeeeen!! is a sub-brand featuring young wrestlers recruited through a talent scouting program.

Ganbare☆Pro-Wrestling

Tokyo Joshi Pro-Wrestling

Corporate staff

Alumni/notable guests

Male wrestlers

 Akebono
 Asian Cougar
 Atsushi Maruyama
 Brahman Kei
 Brahman Shu
 Choun Shiryu
 Chocoball Mukai
 Dai Suzuki
 Daigoro Kashiwa
 Daisuke Sekimoto
 Dick Togo
 DJ Nira
 El Generico
 Exciting Yoshida
 Fuma
 Futoshi Miwa
 Gentaro
 Glenn "Q" Spectre
 Guanchulo
 Guts Ishijima
 Hikaru Sato
 Hub
 Isami Kodaka
 Jaki Numazawa
 Jigoku Soldier
 Jiro "Ikemen" Kuroshio
 Joey Ryan
 Jun Kasai
 Kai
 Kaji Tomato
 Kazuhiko Ogasawara
 Kendo Kashin
 Kenny Omega
 Kenzo Suzuki
 Kintaro Kanemura
 Kim Nan-pun
 Kota Ibushi
 Kota Sekifuda
 Mikami
 Ladybeard
 Masao Orihara
 Masato Tanaka
 Michael Nakazawa
 Mitsunobu Kikuzawa
 Naoki Tanizaki
 Nobutaka Araya
 Nobutaka Moribe/Mori Bernard
 Nosawa Rongai
 Poison Sawada Julie
 Rising Hayato
 Ryuichi Kawakami
 Ryuji Ito
 Sami Callihan
 Seigo Tachibana
 Seiya Morohashi
 Shigehiro Irie
 Shinobu
 Shiro Koshinaka
 Shinya Ishikawa
 Shoichi Ichimiya
 Shuji Ishikawa
 Super Uchuu Power
 Taka Michinoku
 Takashi Sasaki
 Takayuki Ueki
 Koju Takeda
 Takoyakida
 Tatsumi Fujinami
 Thanomsak Toba
 Tomohiko Hashimoto
 Tsubasa
 Yasu Urano
 Yoshiya
 Yusuke Kubo
 Zack Sabre Jr.

Joshi talent (TJPW/Other)

 Aoi Kizuki
 Cherry
 Gami
 Hikari Shimizu
 Kana
 LiLiCo
 Marika Kobashi
 Maho Kurone
 Meiko Satomura
 Michiko Miyagi
 Mirai Maiumi
 Misae Genki
 Neko Nitta
 Saki
 Saori Anou
 Sayaka Obihiro
 Unagi Sayaka
 Azusa Takigawa
 Nodoka Tenma
 Yuki Aino
 Yuki Arai
 Yuu
 Yuu Yamagata

Notes

References

External links

Lists of professional wrestling personnel
Personnel